HMS Resolute was a mid-19th-century barque-rigged ship of the British Royal Navy, specially outfitted for  Arctic exploration.  Resolute became trapped in the ice and was abandoned in 1854.  Recovered by an American whaler, she was returned to Queen Victoria in 1856. Timbers from the ship were later used to construct the Resolute desk which was presented to the President of the United States and is currently located in the White House Oval Office.

History

In the face of rising concerns regarding the fate of the Arctic expedition of Sir John Franklin, having left Britain in 1845 in search of the North West Passage, the British Government, in 1848, sent expeditions in search of the expedition. With few existing warships deemed suitable, six merchant ships were purchased between 1848 and 1850 and soon converted to exploration ships: two steamships, HMS Pioneer and HMS Intrepid, the other four (Resolute,  and ) seagoing sailing ships. The first ship to set sail in search of Franklin was HMS Herald, and at the helm, Captain Henry Kellett. Herald went through the Bering Strait to search the western reaches of the Canadian Arctic. In 1850, HMS Investigator, Captain McClure, and HMS Enterprise, Captain Collinson were sent to the Arctic from the west.

Resolute, formerly known as the barque Ptarmigan, was purchased on 21 February 1850 and renamed a month later. Fitted for Arctic service by the Blackwall Civilian Shipyard Blackwall Yard, the refitting included installation of strong timbers, an internal heating system, and a polar bear as a figurehead.

During 1850-51 Resolute (flagship), Assistance, Pioneer and Intrepid, sailed the eastern Arctic under the command of Horatio Thomas Austin.  The expedition found traces of Franklin's first winter camp on Beechey Island.

During the winter months, from October 1850-March 1851, Second Master George F. McDougall, from Resolute and Lieutenant Sherard Osborn of Intrepid published five accounts in The Illustrated Arctic News, in what the editors identified as the "Barrow Strait". Upon returning the Resolute to her home port in England, the manuscript paper was printed in London in 1852. Atwood (1997) references extant copies of the papers at both the British Museum and the Scott Polar Research Institute, Cambridge.

Belcher Expedition
After returning to England, the squadron assigned to Austin received provisions and placed under the command of Sir Edward Belcher. The Belcher Expedition was augmented by the addition of a fifth ship, North Star that remained at Beechey Island as a depot ship. Belcher's orders contained the following objectives: to find Franklin, or evidence regarding his fate by broadening the search to the Eastern Canadian Arctic; and to split the expedition at Beechey Island and send Resolute and Intrepid west in search of Franklin, as well as secure provisions for Investigator and Enterprise. The expedition left England in April 1852, and later crossed Baffin Bay westward in August 1852. After the rendezvous of the five ships at Beechey Island, splitting the squadron was necessary. The flagship Assistance and her steam tender, Pioneer, headed north up Wellington Channel. Resolute, then under Captain Kellett, and her steam tender, Intrepid, headed west and North Star remained at Beechey Island. In 1852, of the seven Royal Navy ships searching the Arctic, only Enterprise found traces of Franklin's expedition in the form of a small quantity of timber on the eastern coast of Victoria Island.

The crew of Resolute set up winter camp and a temporary dock on the stationary land ice of Dealy Island near the north shore of Viscount Melville Sound. During the spring and summer of 1853, the crews of Resolute and Intrepid sledged aboard in search of clues to Franklin's whereabouts in hope to locate Investigator and Enterprise. They found neither Franklin nor Enterprise, but did succeed in finding and rescuing Captain McClure and his crew upon the ice-bound ship, HMS Investigator in April 1853. Captain Kellett ordered McClure to abandon Investigator due to the ship being frozen in ice since 1850. The lack of a proper spring and summer thaw kept the ship at bay. The conditions caused severe hardship for the crew, forcing the crew to reduce their rations for over a year. Before winter set in, and while passage remained open at Dealy Island, the 1852–53 winter camp was dissolved and Resolute and Intrepid sailed eastward. In August 1853, a cold front caused the open passage to freeze, encasing Resolute in ice. The crew prepared the ship for the winter by stowing her sails and upper rigging below deck. Resolute was still beset by this floe ice in the spring of 1854. In April, Belcher ordered Captain Kellett to abandon Resolute. Despite his protest, Kellett obeyed orders and prepared the ship for winter. In May, Captain Kellett left Resolute locked in the slowly moving floe ice, and led his men in a hard march across the ice to reach the ships of the expedition at Beechey Island. Their number included the officers and crew of Investigator, rescued by Kellett in the spring of 1853, and the men from Intrepid and Resolute.

Two of the other main vessels of Belcher's fleet were abandoned, the flagship Assistance and her steam tender, Pioneer. Belcher arrived at Beechey Island between May–August 1854. The men left Beechey Island on 29 August 1854.

The British Government announced in The London Gazette that the ships, including Resolute, were still Her Majesty's property, but no salvage was attempted.

On 10 September 1855, the abandoned Resolute was found adrift by the American whaler George Henry, captained by James Buddington of Groton, Connecticut in an ice floe off Cape Walsingham of Baffin Island,   from where she had been abandoned. An October,  1856 New York Journal article relates Captain Budington and crew's encounter:  
 Buddington split his crew, and took 13 men with him on the Resolute. He arrived home in New London, Connecticut on Christmas Eve.

Although most of the expeditions in search of the lost Franklin expedition, before 1856, were funded by either the British government or by public subscription from within the British Empire, two expeditions were funded by Henry Grinnell, a New York merchant and shipowner in New Bedford, in addition to the assistance offered by the United States Government. Senator James Mason of Virginia, presented Congress with the bill to restore Resolute and return her to England as a gesture of "national courtesy". Grinnell wrote in support of this bill. The United States Congress purchased the Resolute for $40,000. Once refitted, Commander Henry J. Hartstene sailed Resolute to England to present the ship to Queen Victoria on 13 December 1856 as a token of comity.

Both Grinnell and Lady Jane Franklin hoped the restored Resolute would once again be employed for a new expedition in search of the Franklin expedition. Evidence found by John Rae proved beyond reasonable doubt that the crew had suffered harsh conditions that led to their deaths. The British Government declined. Lady Franklin organized a private expedition under Francis Leopold McClintock, who, in 1859, located the only written account of the fate of Franklin.

Resolute served in the Royal Navy from 1856 but never left home waters. Retired in 1879, Resolute was later salvaged for timber. The Canadian settlement of Resolute, Nunavut, is named after the ship. In March 2009, British Prime Minister Gordon Brown presented US President Barack Obama with the framed commission of Resolute, and a pen holder made from the wood of another Royal Navy ship, .

The Resolute desks

The British government ordered at least three desks to be made from the timbers of the ship, and they were constructed by cabinet makers at the Joiner's Shop of Chatham Dockyard. A large partner's desk was presented to U.S. President Rutherford B. Hayes in 1880 as a gesture of thanks for the rescue and return of Resolute. Since then, this desk—known as the Resolute desk—has been used by every American President in some capacity except Lyndon Johnson, Richard Nixon, and Gerald Ford. Eight Presidents have used it as their official desk in the Oval Office starting with John F. Kennedy, but some have had it in their private study in the Executive Residence.

A second desk, called the Grinnell Desk or the Queen Victoria Desk, was also made from the timbers of HMS Resolute. This smaller lady's desk was presented to the widow of Henry Grinnell in 1880 in recognition of her husband's generous contributions to the search for Franklin. In 1983 it was given to the New Bedford Whaling Museum and is in their collection in New Bedford, Massachusetts.

A  third desk, or more accurately a writing table, was commissioned by Queen Victoria; it remains part of the Royal Collection.

HMS Resolute in popular media
The 2007 novel HMS Resolute by Elizabeth Matthews is about the discovery of Resolute by the whaler George Henry.
HMS Resolutes story is an integral clue in the plot of the film National Treasure: Book of Secrets. The relevance of the two desks to the discovery of further clues is concealed in the version of the Statue of Liberty upon the Île aux Cygnes in Paris, France. The anecdote "These twins stand resolute to preserve what we are looking for" refers to the twin Resolute desks made from the ship's timbers, with one located in The White House and the other in the Royal Naval Museum at Portsmouth (though in the film, the desk is located in Buckingham Palace).
The book Resolute, by Martin Sandler, tells the story, with historical accuracy of all the different expeditions tied to the one by John Franklin, HMS Resolute being one of them.

References

Further reading
Roderic Owen (1978). The Fate of Franklin, Hutchinson. .
John Brown, F.R.G.S. (1860). The North-West Passage and the Plans for the Search for Sir John Franklin: A Review with maps, &c., Second Edition with a Sequel Including the Voyage of the "Fox" London, E. Stanford, 1860.
Sherard Osborn and George F. McDougall, eds. (1852) Facsimile of the Illustrated Arctic News, Published on Board H.M.S. Resolute, Captain Horatio T. Austin, C.B., In Search of the Expedition Under Sir John Franklin (London, Ackerman, 1852).
Sandler, Martin W. (2006). Resolute: The Epic Search for the Northwest Passage and John Franklin, and the Discovery of the Queen's Ghost Ship.

External links

Ships of the Royal Navy
Victorian-era naval ships of the United Kingdom
Exploration ships of the United Kingdom
Baffin Island
Ships built on the River Tyne
Arctic exploration vessels
Maritime incidents in May 1854
Ghost ships